Gabronite or Gabbronite is a former name for a mineral found in Norway, no longer widely used. It describes a form of scapolite or nepheline.

Current views

Mindat.org defines the term "Gabbronite" as:
Old discredited name, has been referred to as both Scapolite and Nepheline. [Clark, 1993, 249 - "Hey's Mineral Index - 3rd Edition"]
Wiktionary defines "Gabbronite" as "A compact variety of scapolite, resembling gabbro."

The term is sometimes used in modern geological descriptions. Thus a description of the Matamec Ecological Reserve in Quebec, Canada says, "Elsewhere, igneous rock is composed of anorthosite, gabronite and granite."

A web search is likely to show a polished mostly-black stone used in jewelry.

Descriptions

William Phillips (1773–1828) lists the mineral under SILEX, and describes it as follows:

According to Parker Cleaveland (1780–1858) the mineral is probably a variety of Fettstein.
Cleaveland defines it as follows:

Webster's 1828 English Dictionary gives:
GA'BRONITE, n. A mineral, supposed to be a variety of fettstein. It occurs in masses, whose structure is more or less foliated, or sometimes compact. Its colors are gray, bluish or greenish gray, and sometimes red.

Armand Dufrénoy (1792–1857) describes the mineral as:
Gabronite. – This mineral, found only in Arendal in Norway, is found in an amorphous mass, with a compact or hard lamellar texture... The École des Mines possesses a sample in which I have been able to recognize not only that the angles are straight, but that there is a diagonal cleavage at an angle of about 135°; from which it follows that the prism is square, as in wernérite [common scapolite]: the shine of gabronite is fat and oily. Its color is dirty gray, greenish gray; it barely scratches glass: its specific gravity is 2.74. The composition of gabronite, which I will give in a few lines, departs from that of wernérite by the great quantity of soda it contains. This circumstance induced M. Beudant to associate it with nepheline; but the six-sided prism form of this latter species is opposed to this association.

See also
Gabbronorite

Notes

Sources

Gemstones
Silicon compounds